is a special ward located in Tokyo, Japan. Situated in the middle of the ward area, Bunkyō is a residential and educational center. Beginning in the Meiji period, literati like Natsume Sōseki, as well as scholars and politicians have lived there. Bunkyō is home to the Tokyo Dome, Judo's Kōdōkan, and the University of Tokyo's Hongo Campus. Bunkyō has a sister-city relationship with Kaiserslautern in the Rhineland-Palatinate of Germany.

It was formed in 1947 as a merger of Hongo and Koishikawa wards following Tokyo City's transformation into Tokyo Metropolis. The modern Bunkyo ward exhibits contrasting Shitamachi and Yamanote geographical and cultural division. The Nezu and Sendagi neighborhoods in the ward's eastern corner is attached to the Shitamachi area in Ueno with more traditional Japanese atmosphere. On the other hand, the remaining areas of the ward typically represent Yamanote districts.

As of May 1, 2015, the ward has a population of 217,743 (including about 6,500 foreign residents), and a population density of 19,290 persons per km². The total area is 11.29 km².

History
Bunkyo was formed in 1947 as a merger of Hongo and Koishikawa wards following Tokyo City's transformation into Tokyo Metropolis.

Geography

Districts and neighborhoods
There are approximately twenty districts in the area and these are as follows:

Koishikawa Area
 Hakusan
 Kasuga
 Kohinata
 Koishikawa
 Kōraku
 Mejirodai
 Otowa
 Ōtsuka
 Sekiguchi
 Sengoku
 Suidō

Hongō Area
 Hongō
 Honkomagome
 Mukōgaoka
 Nezu
 Nishikata
 Sendagi
 Yayoi
 Yushima

Politics and government
Bunkyo is governed by Mayor Hironobu Narisawa, an independent supported by the Liberal Democratic Party, Democratic Party of Japan and Komeito. The city council has 34 elected members.

Economy
The publishing company Kodansha has its headquarters in the ward, and Kodansha International has its headquarters in the Otowa YK Building in the ward. The drugstore chain Tomod's has its headquarters in the ward. Penta-Ocean, the construction firm specializing in marine works and land reclamation also has its headquarters in Bunkyo.
The automobile manufacturer Toyota has its Tokyo headquarters in the ward.

Landmarks

 Chinzan-so Garden
 Denzū-in Temple
 Gokoku-ji Temple
 Harimasaka Sakura Colonnade
 Hatoyama Hall
 Kisshō-ji
 Kodansha Noma Memorial Museum
 Kodokan Judo Institute
 Koishikawa Botanical Garden
 Koishikawa Kōrakuen
 Nezu Shrine
 Nippon Medical School
 Rikugien Garden
 Shin-Edogawa Garden
 Tokyo Cathedral (St. Mary's Cathedral)
 Tokyo Dome
 Tokyo Dome City
 Toshimagaoka Imperial Cemetery
 Toyo University
 Tōyō Bunko "Oriental Library", Japan's largest Asian studies library 
 University of Tokyo
 Yanaka Cemetery
 Yushima Seidō

Education

Universities and colleges

National

Ochanomizu University
University of Tsukuba Ōtsuka Campus
University of Tokyo Hongō Campus
Tokyo Medical and Dental University

Private

Atomi University
Juntendo University
Takushoku University
Chuo University Engineering department
Tokyo Woman's Christian University
Toyo University
Toyo Gakuen University
Nippon Medical School
Japan Women's University
Bunkyo Gakuin University
Bunkyo Gakuin College
International College for Postgraduate Buddhist Studies

Primary and secondary schools
Nationally-operated high schools:
 
 

Public high schools are operated by the Tokyo Metropolitan Government Board of Education.
 
 Koishikawa High School
 
 
The metropolis operates the Koishikawa Secondary Education School.

Public elementary and junior high schools are operated by Bunkyo Board of Education.

Municipal junior high schools:
 No. 1 Junior High School (第一中学校)
 No. 3 Junior High School (第三中学校)
 No. 6 Junior High School (第六中学校)
 No. 8 Junior High School (第八中学校)
 No. 9 Junior High School (第九中学校)
 No. 10 Junior High School (第十中学校)
 Bunrin Junior High School (文林中学校)
 Hongodai Junior High School (本郷台中学校)
 Meidai Junior High School (茗台中学校)
 Otowa Junior High School (音羽中学校)

Municipal elementary schools:
 Aoyagi Elementary School (青柳小学校)
 Hayashicho Elementary School (林町小学校)
 Hongo Elementary School (本郷小学校)
 Kagomachi Elementary School (駕籠町小学校)
 Kanatomi Elementary School (金富小学校)
 Kohinata Daimachi Elementary School (小日向台町小学校)
 Komamoto Elementary School (駒本小学校)
 Kubomachi Elementary School (窪町小学校)
 Meika Elementary School (明化小学校)
 Nezu Elementary School (根津小学校)
 Otsuka Elementary School (大塚小学校)
 Rekisen Elementary School (礫川小学校)
 Sasugaya Elementary School (指ケ谷小学校)
 Seishi Elementary School (誠之小学校)
 Sekiguchi Daimachi Elementary School (関口台町小学校)
 Sendagi Elementary School (千駄木小学校)
 Shiomi Elementary School (汐見小学校)
 Showa Elementary School (昭和小学校)
 Yanagicho Elementary School (柳町小学校)
 Yushima Elementary School (湯島小学校)

Culture

Museums
 Bunkyo Museum
 Eisei Bunko Museum
 Japanese Baseball Hall of Fame
 Kodansha Noma Memorial Museum
 Koishikawa Annex
 Koishikawa Ukiyo-e Art Museum
 Orugoru no Chiisana Hakubutsukan
 Printing Museum, Tokyo
 The University Museum, The University of Tokyo
 Tokyo Waterworks Historical Museum
 Yayoi Museum

Transportation

Train stations

Toei subway lines
 Toei Mita Line: Sengoku, Hakusan, Kasuga, Suidōbashi
 Toei Ōedo Line: Iidabashi, Kasuga, Hongō Sanchōme

Tokyo Metro subway lines
 Tokyo Metro Chiyoda Line: Sendagi, Nezu, Yushima
 Tokyo Metro Marunouchi Line: Shin-Ōtsuka, Myōgadani, Kōrakuen, Hongō Sanchōme, Ochanomizu
 Tokyo Metro Yūrakuchō Line: Gokokuji, Edogawabashi
 Tokyo Metro Namboku Line: Kōrakuen, Tōdaimae, Honkomagome

Highways
Shuto Expressway
No.5 Ikebukuro Route (Takebashi JCT—Bijogi JCT)

Notable people from Bunkyō
 Hayao Miyazaki (Nihongo: 宮崎 駿, Miyazaki Hayao), Japanese animator, director, producer, screenwriter, author, manga artist and one of the co-founders of Studio Ghibli
 Makiko Tanaka (Nihongo: 田中 眞紀子, Tanaka Makiko), Japanese politician and daughter of Kakuei Tanaka (former Prime Minister of Japan)
 Osamu Noguchi (Nihongo: 野口 修, Noguchi Osamu), the creator of Kickboxing
 Kaito Ishikawa (Nihongo: 石川 界人, Ishikawa Kaito), Japanese voice actor
 Yukio Hatoyama (Nihongo: 鳩山 由紀夫, Hatoyama Yukio), Japanese politician and former Prime Minister of Japan
 Shinichiro Kobayashi (Nihongo: 小林 伸一郎, Kobayashi Shin'ichirō), Japanese photographer
 Teiichi Matsumaru (Nihongo: 松丸 貞一, Matsumaru Teiichi), Japanese football player
 Hiroto Muraoka (Nihongo: 村岡 博人, Muraoka Hiroto), Japanese football player
 Yu-ki Matsumura (Real Name: Noriyuki Matsumura, Nihongo: 松村 憲幸, Matsumura Noriyuki), Japanese actor and singer
 Yūko Minaguchi (Nihongo: 皆口 裕子, Minaguchi Yūko), Japanese actress, voice actress and narrator
 Yukio Tsuchiya (Nihongo: 土屋 征夫, Tsuchiya Yukio), Japanese football player (Tokyo 23 FC)

See also

References

External links

Bunkyo City Official Website 

 
Wards of Tokyo